Gordon Central High School is a grade 9–12 public high school in Calhoun, Georgia, Gordon County, United States. It enrolls approximately 850 students yearly.

Athletics
Gordon Central competes in sports including football, baseball, basketball, tennis, track and field,  cheerleading, golf, wrestling, soccer, softball, and cross country.

Fine arts
Gordon Central has an outstanding fine arts program.

The marching band (the Blue Wave Band) regularly finishes first at competitions.

The Chorus Department is known for its award-winning history.

The school participates in literary, one-act, and academic bowl competitions.

Notable alumni
 Barry Hall - NFL player; offensive lineman for the Tennessee Titans and Middle Tennessee State University

References

External links
 Gordon Central High School
 Band
 Chorus
 Location and information
 Marching band
 Gordon County Board of Education
 Gordon County Board of Education  - athletics

Public high schools in Georgia (U.S. state)
Schools in Gordon County, Georgia